Violet Hopkins is an American painter. She holds a BFA from the University of Texas at Austin, and an MFA from the California Institute of the Arts, Valencia. Hopkins work often draws inspiration from found images of the natural and scientific world, using ink, pencil and paint to transform them into color-rich, dynamic scenes that incorporate both abstract and figurative elements.

Amra Brooks, in Artforum called her 2006 "Chromatophoric" exhibition at David Kordansky Gallery, "magical."

An exhibition in New York 2009 was based around the 1977 Voyager space program. Time Out concluded that "Violet Hopkins's latest paintings won't blow your mind... [but] her project acknowledges art's challenge to interact with a vast, ever-changing world."

Several of Hopkins' works reside in the permanent collection of the Museum of Modern Art in New York.

References

Further reading 
 Tumlir, Jan. " Los Angeles: Drawing in L.A.", The Judith Rothschild Foundation Contemporary Drawings Collection - Raisonné. MoMA, New York. 2009: 26 - 35.
Walleston, Aimee. "Ground Control." Interview online, May 26, 2009.
Griggs-Saito, Katrina. "Violet Hopkins: Lux, Lumen." The Japan Times, May 29, 2008.
Patterson, Tom. "A Profusion of Pleasure." Winston-Salem Journal, 31 December 2006.
Spiegler, Marc. "LA Art Is Here To Stay." The Art Newspaper, 8 December 2006: P.1.v
Wagner, James. "Violet Hopkins at Foxy Production." jameswagner.com, 7 November 2006.
Pagel, David. "Summer Sampler Has a Dark Side." The Los Angeles Times, 8 July 2005: E26.
Finkel, Jori. "First Come the Dealers, and Then the Diplomas." The New York Times, 3 July 2005: 22-23.
Cotter, Holland. "Dealers Gather at the River, Convenient to Lofts with Bare Walls." The New York Times, 11 March 2005: E46.

Living people
20th-century American painters
21st-century American painters
Painters from Texas
American women painters
20th-century American women artists
21st-century American women artists
Year of birth missing (living people)